Rouvroy is a commune in the Pas-de-Calais department in the Hauts-de-France region of France.

Geography

Population
The inhabitants are called Rouvroysiens.

Places of interest
 The modern church of Saint-Géry-et-Saint-Louis, built to replace the original that was destroyed, along with most of the commune, during World War I.

Nearest communes
 Méricourt, west
 Billy-Montigny, north
 Hénin-Beaumont, northeast
 Drocourt, east
 Bois-Bernard, southeast
 Acheville, southwest

See also
 Communes of the Pas-de-Calais department

References

External links

 Official town website 
 Website of the Communauté d'agglomération d'Hénin-Carvin 

Communes of Pas-de-Calais
French Flanders